Vilela may refer to:

Vilela (Amares), a parish (freguesia) in Amares municipality, Portugal
Vilela (Póvoa de Lanhoso), a parish (freguesia) in Póvoa de Lanhoso municipality, Portugal
Vilela language, an endangered Lule-Vilela language, indigenous to northwestern Argentina
Vilela people, indigenous people of Argentina
Amy Vilela (born 1974 or 1975), American politician
João Vilela (born 1985), Portuguese footballer
José Luis Vilela de Acuña (born 1953), Cuban chess master
Ivan Vilela (born 1962), Brazilian musician and composer